Citrus Connection is the public transit system of Lakeland, Florida, operated by the Lakeland Area Mass Transit District (LAMTD).  The system operates a fleet of 33 buses on 14 routes in the Lakeland area, including service provided for Winter Haven Area Transit to the neighboring cities of Auburndale, Winter Haven and Bartow.

The system also operates paratransit service with 15 Handy buses.

Citrus Connection has operated since 1982. LAMTD is financed by a property tax and by funding from federal, state and city government.

In September 2008, the Polk Transit Authority was established with a view to the eventual consolidation of the LAMTD and Winter Haven Area Transit, and the extension of transit service throughout Polk County.

Routes
1 Florida Ave. Corridor
3 Lakeland Hills Corridor
10 Circulator
12 Lakeland to Winter Haven
14 Combee/Edgewood
15 Kathleen/Providence/Harden
22XL Bartow Express
33 South Florida/Carter Rd.
39 Bradley
45 George Jenkins/Swindell
46 10th/Wabash/Ariana
47 Duff Rd. Shuttle
58 College Connector
59 County Line Rd
61 US 98 N / Banana Rd

References

External links
Citrus Connection website
Citrus Connection Bus Info

Bus transportation in Florida
Transportation in Polk County, Florida
Lakeland, Florida
1982 establishments in Florida